Neeraj Pandey (born 17 December 1973) is an Indian film director, producer and screenwriter who works in Hindi cinema. Pandey was made his directoral debut in A Wednesday!, which was largely praised by critics and which later became a recipient of many accolades. His second film was Special 26 (2013), which was followed by Baby (2015), the latter of which received critical acclaim and became a huge commercial success. He served as a producer in Rustom (2016). Pandey returned to directing in 2016 helming the biopic movie M.S. Dhoni: The Untold Story based on Indian cricketer M.S.Dhoni which fared well critically and commercially. Besides being a filmmaker, Pandey is also a writer and has written a novel named Ghalib Danger in 2013.

In 2016, his production house Friday Filmworks entered into a joint venture with Reliance Entertainment and formed Plan C Studios.

He has also directed a Web Short 'Ouch' with Manoj Bajpayee and Pooja Chopra which is nominated for Filmfare Short Film Award 2017. He was the co-producer of the film Toilet- Ek Prem Katha. His next release was Aiyaary which starred Sidharth Malhotra and Manoj Bajpayee and was both critically and commercially unsuccessful, becoming his first failed venture.

In March 2020, Neeraj Pandey presented and directed his first web series Special Ops on Hotstar. The eight episode series, the first production of Friday Storytellers, the digital arm of Friday Filmworks, was extremely well received by the critics. He is currently working on his next feature film Chanakya.

Early life and education
Pandey was born and brought up in Howrah, West Bengal. His father, who originally came from Arrah, Bihar and worked for Bosch in Calcutta. He did his schooling from St. Aloysius High School, Howrah (till Class X) and then St. Thomas' High School, Dasnagar, Howrah (Class XI and XII). Pandey moved to New Delhi, where he graduated in English from Sri Aurobindo college(University of Delhi)

Career
Pandey started his career working with Delhi-based 'Legacy Entertainment', a company started by the Dalmia Group to make television programs.

In 2000, he moved to Mumbai, where a friend got a grant to produce a documentary, and offered him the project.[3] Soon he started making documentaries and ad films. Thereafter, he formed a production company 'Quarter Inch Productions', along with his colleague Shital Bhatia which specialized in making television programmes, ad films and documentaries. In 2008, Neeraj and Shital Bhatia formed a production house named Friday Filmworks, which was the original producer of his debut film, A Wednesday!. The film's script was inspired by the 11 July 2006 Mumbai train bombings.[4]

In 2011, Pandey produced the film Taryanche Bait.

After directing his first movie in 2008, Pandey directed his second movie Special 26 in 2013, starring Akshay Kumar and Kajal Aggrawal. Neeraj is very fluent in Bengali and also produced a Bengali film, The Royal Bengal Tiger in 2014. In the same year he also produced the film Total Siyappa starring Yami Gautam and Ali Zafar. In 2015, he directed the movie Baby starring Akshay Kumar. In 2016, he produced the film Saat Uchakkey which was a comedy film starring Manoj Bajpayee, Kay Kay Menon and Aditi Sharma.

In 2016, Anil Ambani-owned Reliance Entertainment announced a joint venture with Pandey and Friday Filmworks to form Plan C studios for production of films. Akshay Kumar starrer Rustom was the first film for the company. It is an equal partnership joint venture between the two.

Pandey has also written his debut novel titled Ghalib Danger which was launched on 6 December 2013. The novel is soon going to be made into a motion picture.

In 2017, having co-produced Toilet- Ek Prem Katha, a satirical take on the open defecation scenario in India went on to become a critically acclaimed movie.

He has also directed the short film Ouch with Manoj Bajpayee and Pooja Chopra which is nominated for the Filmfare Short Film Award 2017.

His next release was Aiyaary which starred Sidharth Malhotra and Manoj Bajpayee and was both critically and commercially flop emerging as his first failure. This film was written, directed by himself and produced under the banner of Plan C Studios, the film was an action thriller on the Indian borders. Malhotra and Bajpayee played the lead characters Jai Bakshi and Abhay Singh respectively. Naseeruddin Shah reunited with the filmmaker after their first venture, A Wednesday!. The film was based on true incidents, a theme seen in several of his previous films as well.

In March 2020, Pandey presented and directed his first web series Special Ops on Hotstar. The eight episode series, the first production of Friday Storytellers, the digital arm of Friday Filmworks, was extremely well received by the critics.

Currently, he is working on his next film, a full length feature film, Chanakya. This will be his first association with Ajay Devgn.

Filmography

Television

Bibliography
 Ghalib Danger (2013)

Awards

References

External links

 
 Neeraj Pandey at Bollywood Hungama

1973 births
Living people
Film directors from Kolkata
Delhi University alumni
Hindi-language film directors
Indian male screenwriters
21st-century Indian film directors
Film directors from Bihar
People from Bhojpur district, India
Director whose film won the Best Debut Feature Film National Film Award
Screen Awards winners